Álvaro de Lacalle Leloup (29 October 1918 – 1 September 2004) was a Spanish military officer who served as President of the Board of Joint Chiefs of Staff  between 1982 and 1984, i.e., chief of staff of the Spanish Armed Forces at the time.

During the Spanish Civil War, Lacalle was a Carlist Requeté combatant for the Nationalist faction. During World War II, he was one of the volunteers of the so-called Blue Division, or the 250th Infantry Division of the Wehrmacht; the division was sent to the Eastern Front by the Francoist regime to fight alongside Nazi Germany against the Soviet Union.

Awards
 Grand Cross (with White Decoration) of Naval Merit (1962)
 Grand Cross of the Royal and Military Order of Saint Hermenegild (1975)
 Grand Cross of the Order of Isabella the Catholic (1984)
 Grand Cross of the Military Order of St. Gregory the Great (1984)

References

1918 births
2004 deaths
People from La Rioja
20th-century Spanish military personnel
Spanish lieutenant generals
Spanish military personnel of the Spanish Civil War (National faction)
Spanish military personnel of World War II
Grand Crosses of the Royal and Military Order of San Hermenegild
Grand Crosses of Naval Merit
Knights Grand Cross of the Order of Isabella the Catholic
Knights Grand Cross of the Order of St Gregory the Great